International Psychoanalytic University Berlin (IPU) is a private non-profit university in Berlin, Germany. It was founded in 2009 by the "Gesellschaft zur Förderung der universitären Psychoanalyse mbH" (Limited Liability Society to Promote University Psychoanalysis), initiated by Christa Rohde-Dachser and Jürgen Körner. The IPU commenced its teaching and research activities in the autumn of 2009.

IPU Berlin has been state-recognized and was awarded its institutional accreditation by the German Council of Science and Humanities in November 2014.

Ranking 
IPU Berlin's MA Psychology course was ranked first in the 2016 CHE Universityranking among Germany's psychology master programs.

References

External links

Educational institutions established in 2009
Private universities and colleges in Germany
Universities and colleges in Berlin
2009 establishments in Germany